Agdistis minima is a moth in the family Pterophoridae. It is known from Socotra, Yemen.

References

Agdistinae
Fauna of Socotra
Moths described in 1900